The Maddest Car in the World is a 1975 West German comedy film directed by Rudolf Zehetgruber starring Zehetgruber, Salvatore Borghese, Kathrin Oginski, and Walter Giller.

It was one of Zehetgruber's films in the Superbug film series. It was made as a response to the German box office success of The Love Bug (Herbie).

Cast

References

Bibliography

External links 
 

1975 films
1975 comedy films
German comedy films
West German films
1970s German-language films
Films directed by Rudolf Zehetgruber
Films scored by Gerhard Heinz
Constantin Film films
Films set in Switzerland
Films about automobiles
1970s German films